The 2015–16 Quinnipiac Bobcats women's basketball team represents Quinnipiac University  during the 2015–16 NCAA Division I women's basketball season. The Bobcats, led by twenty-first head coach, Tricia Fabbri. They play their home games in TD Bank Sports Center, and were members of the Metro Atlantic Athletic Conference. They finished the season 25–9, 17–3 in MAAC play to win MAAC regular season title. They advanced to the championship game of the MAAC women's tournament where they lost to Iona. As champs of the Metro Atlantic Athletic Conference who failed to win their conference tournament, they received an automatic bid to the Women's National Invitation Tournament where they defeated Maine in the first round before losing to Temple in the second round.

Roster

Schedule

|-
!colspan=9 style="background:#003664; color:#C2980B;"| Regular season

|-
!colspan=9 style="background:#003664; color:#C2980B;"| MAAC Women's Tournament

|-
!colspan=9 style="background:#003664; color:#C2980B;"| WNIT

See also
 2015–16 Quinnipiac Bobcats men's basketball team

References

Quinnipiac Bobcats women's basketball seasons
Quinnipiac
2016 Women's National Invitation Tournament participants